A Liégeois is a non-alcoholic mixed drink made with two parts: orange soft drink and a splash of grenadine. This mix drink is best known in the province of Liège in Belgium.

External links
 Recipe at 1001cocktails.com
 Faire un cocktail Liégeois (preparing a cocktail Liégeois) (youtube)

Non-alcoholic mixed drinks